Martin Pfurtscheller (born 7 March 1968) is an Austrian former biathlete. He competed in the men's 20 km individual event at the 1994 Winter Olympics.

References

External links
 

1968 births
Living people
Austrian male biathletes
Olympic biathletes of Austria
Biathletes at the 1994 Winter Olympics
People from Hall in Tirol
Sportspeople from Tyrol (state)